The Icelandic Sculptors Society was established in the Icelandic capital of Reykjavík in 1972 by Hallsteinn Sigurðsson, Jon Gunnar Árnason, Ragnar Kjartansson, Þorbjörg Pálsdóttir and others.

References

Culture in Reykjavík
1972 establishments in Iceland
Icelandic art
Cultural organizations based in Iceland
Arts organizations established in 1972